Folck's Mill is a site containing the remains of a historic grist and saw complex located near Cumberland, Allegany County, Maryland. The stone foundation of the mill, measuring 30 feet by 40 feet, is the principal feature of the site. It is historically significant for its association with the August 1, 1864, Civil War "Battle of Folck's Mill."   In that battle, Union troops commanded by General Benjamin F. Kelley engaged General John McCausland’s Confederate forces as they advanced along the Baltimore Pike towards Cumberland after having burned the town of Chambersburg, Pennsylvania, two days previously.

It was listed on the National Register of Historic Places in 2008.

References

External links
 at Maryland Historical Trust

Archaeological sites on the National Register of Historic Places in Maryland
Buildings and structures in Allegany County, Maryland
National Register of Historic Places in Allegany County, Maryland